Josh Edwards (born July 21, 1991), known professionally as Blanco White, is an English singer-songwriter and guitarist from London, England. He has released one studio album, On the Other Side.

Career
Originally from London, Edwards travelled to Cadiz, Spain to study flamenco guitar under the guidance of Nono García, before going to Sucre, Bolivia where he was introduced to traditional local folk music and learnt to play the charango, an Andean instrument. In 2014, he brought together Andalusian and Latin American influences while keeping his English musical roots, which launched his solo project Blanco White.

His first show as Blanco White, named after the Spanish poet José María Blanco White, dates back to December 2015 at Proud Camden where he was accompanied by the band Wovoka Gentle.

In 2016, Blanco White signed with Yucatán Records based in London and release his first EP called The Wind Rose. He then released two other EPs Colder Heavens in 2017 and The Nocturne in 2018 respectively.

Since 2016, he toured Europe and the US and was nominated at the Anchor Award in 2018.

On June 5, 2020, Blanco White released his debut studio album titled On the Other Side.

Discography

LPs 
 2020 : On the Other Side

EPs 
 2016 : The Wind Rose 
 2017 : Colder Heavens 
 2018 : The Nocturne

Singles
 2017 : "Colder Heavens" (Acoustic Version) 
 2019 : "On The Other Side"
 2019 : "Papillon"
 2019 : "Desert Days"
 2020 : "Samara"

Awards and nominations

References

External links
 

1991 births
Living people
21st-century English singers
English male singer-songwriters
People from London
21st-century British guitarists
English male guitarists
21st-century British male singers
Musicians from London